The Republic of Pirates was the base and stronghold of a loose confederacy run by privateers-turned-pirates in Nassau on New Providence island in the Bahamas during the Golden Age of Piracy for about eleven years from 1706 until 1718. While it was not a republic in a formal sense, it was governed by an informal pirate code, which dictated that the crews of the Republic would vote on the leadership of their ships and treat other pirate crews with civility. The term comes from Colin Woodard's book of the same name.

The activities of the pirates caused havoc with trade and shipping in the West Indies until newly-appointed Royal Governor of the Bahama Islands Woodes Rogers reached Nassau in 1718 and restored British control. Rogers, a former privateer himself, offered clemency to the pirates of the Bahamas, known as the "King's Pardon", an offer many pirates took advantage of, and though a few would return to piracy in the following years, British control of the Bahamas had been secured.

History

The era of piracy in the Bahamas began in 1696, when the privateer Henry Avery brought his ship the Fancy loaded with loot from plundering Indian trade ships into Nassau harbour. Avery bribed the governor Nicholas Trott with gold and silver, and with the Fancy itself, still loaded with 50 tons of elephant tusks and 100 barrels of gunpowder. This established Nassau as a base where pirates could operate safely, although various governors regularly made a show of suppressing piracy. Although the governors were still legally in charge, the pirates became increasingly powerful.

The era of true pirate control occurred when a combined Franco-Spanish fleet attacked Nassau in 1703 and again in 1706; the island was effectively abandoned by many of its settlers and left without any English government presence. Nassau was then taken over by English privateers, who became completely lawless pirates over time. The pirates attacked French and Spanish ships, while the French and Spanish forces burned Nassau several more times. Pirates established themselves in Nassau, and essentially established their own republic with its own governors. By 1713, the War of the Spanish Succession was over, but many British privateers were slow to get the news, or reluctant to accept it, and so slipped into piracy. This led to large numbers of unemployed privateers making their way to New Providence to join the republic and swell its numbers. The republic was dominated by two famous pirates who were bitter rivals – Benjamin Hornigold and Henry Jennings. Hornigold was mentor to pirates such as the famous Edward Teach, known as "Blackbeard", along with Sam Bellamy and Stede Bonnet. Jennings was mentor to Charles Vane, "Calico" Jack Rackham, Anne Bonny, and Mary Read. Despite their rivalries, the pirates formed themselves into the Flying Gang and quickly became infamous for their exploits. The Governor of Bermuda stated that there were over 1000 pirates in Nassau at that time and that they outnumbered the mere hundred of inhabitants in the town. Blackbeard was later voted by the pirates of Nassau to be their magistrate, to be in command of their republic and enforce law and order as he saw fit.

Pirate Thomas Barrow declared "that he is Governor of Providence and will make it a second Madagascar, and expects 5 or 600 men more from Jamaica sloops to join in the settling of Providence, and to make war on the French and Spaniards, but for the English, they don't intend to meddle with them, unless they are first attack'd by them." While originally the pirates had avoided attacking British ships, this restraint disappeared over time, and at their height, the pirates could command a small fleet of ships that could take on the frigates of the Royal Navy. The amount of havoc caused by the pirates led to an outcry for their destruction, and finally King George I appointed Woodes Rogers as royal governor of the Bahamas to bring the piracy to an end, and offered a pardon to all pirates who turned themselves in.

End of the Republic

Pearse made a list of 209 pirates on New Providence – fewer than half the pirates on the island – who stated their intention to take the pardon.

In 1718, Rogers arrived in Nassau with a fleet of several ships, bringing with him the authority to grant the King's Pardon. Among those who accepted was Benjamin Hornigold, and, in a shrewd move, Rogers commissioned Hornigold to hunt down and capture those pirates who refused to surrender and accept the royal pardon. As a former privateer himself, Hornigold was well placed to understand what needed to be done, and he pursued his former comrades with zeal. Although pirates such as Charles Vane and Blackbeard evaded capture, Hornigold did take ten pirates prisoner and on the morning of 12 December 1718, nine of them were executed. This act re-established British control and ended the pirates' republic in the Bahamas. Those pirates who had fled successfully continued their piratical activities elsewhere in the Caribbean in what has become known as the Golden Age of Piracy.

Code of conduct

The pirates ran their affairs using what was called the pirate code, which was the basis of their claim that their rule of New Providence constituted a kind of republic. According to the code, the pirates ran their ships democratically, sharing plunder equally and selecting and deposing their captains by popular vote. Many of the pirates were privateers out of work since the end of the Queen Anne's War and ex-sailors who had revolted against the conditions on merchant and naval ships. Africans could be equal members of the crew, and several people of mixed European and African descent became pirate captains. Some of the pirates were also Jacobites, who had become pirates to help restore the recently deposed Stuart line to the throne. A few female pirates like Anne Bonny and Mary Read were also present.

Pirates of Nassau

Captain Pearse's list of pirates intending to take the King's Pardon

In popular culture
In Assassin's Creed IV: Black Flag, fictional character Edward Kenway helps to seize control of Nassau and establish the pirate republic with other major pirates of the Golden Age of Piracy.

The TV series Black Sails is largely based on the history and famous historical pirate inhabitants of Nassau. Several characters' motivations are rooted in the idea of establishing a true "Republic of Pirates" in Nassau.

The Netflix limited series The Lost Pirate Kingdom (2021) is also based on the exploits and rivalries of both the Republic of Pirates as well as the Flying Gang and its members, including Benjamin Hornigold, Sam Bellamy, Henry Jennings, and Blackbeard.

The 2022 HBO Max series Our Flag Means Death features the Republic of Pirates in episode 3, "A Gentleman Pirate".

See also
1715 Treasure Fleet
Brethren of the Coast
Distribution of justice

Jolly Roger
Libertatia
Republic of Salé
Thalassocracy
Victual Brothers

References

Bibliography

External links
Cruise Port Insider website on Nassau history
St. Augustine Pirate and Treasure Museum website
Website of the book The Republic of Pirates by Colin Wodward Archived
Website on Pirate Code

18th century in the Bahamas
History of the Colony of the Bahamas
Piracy in the Caribbean
Pirate dens and locations
Former republics
Republicanism in the Bahamas
1700s establishments in the Caribbean
1706 establishments in North America
States and territories established in 1706
1718 disestablishments in North America
2nd-millennium disestablishments in the Caribbean
States and territories disestablished in the 1710s